Lakshmia zolotuhini is a species of moth of the family Cossidae. It is found in Vietnam, Myanmar, India (Sikkim), Thailand and China.

References

Moths described in 2004
Zeuzerinae